Prince Alexander of Yugoslavia ( / Aleksandar P. Karađorđević; 13 August 1924 – 12 May 2016) was the elder son of Prince Paul, who served as Regent of Yugoslavia in the 1930s, and his wife, Princess Olga of Greece and Denmark.

Birth and education
Alexander was born at White Lodge, Richmond Park, United Kingdom. As a nephew of Princess Marina, Duchess of Kent (née of Greece and Denmark), he was a first cousin of Prince Edward, Duke of Kent, Prince Michael of Kent, and Princess Alexandra of Kent; he was also a first cousin once removed of Prince Philip, Duke of Edinburgh. He was educated at Ludgrove School.

Marriage and family
On 12 February 1955, Alexander married Princess Maria Pia of Savoy, daughter of King Umberto II of Italy and of his wife, Princess Marie José of Belgium. The marriage took place at Cascais in Portugal where the bride's father was living in exile. The couple had met on 22 August 1954 during the royal cruise of the Agamemnon, hosted by King Paul and Queen Frederica of Greece.

Alexander and Maria Pia have twin sons born in 1958:
 Prince Dimitri Umberto Anton Peter Maria of Yugoslavia  (18 June 1958)
 Prince Michael Nicolas Paul George Maria of Yugoslavia (18 June 1958)
Another set of twins was born five years later, this time a girl and a boy:

Prince Sergius "Serge" Wladimir Emanuel Maria of Yugoslavia (born 12 March 1963); married Sophia de Toledo on 6 November 1985. They divorced in 1986. He was remarried to Eleonora Rajneri on 18 September 2004. He has a child named Umberto Emmanuel Dimitri, with Christiane Galeotti, born in 2018.
Princess Helene Olga Lydia Tamara Maria of Yugoslavia (born 12 March 1963); married Thierry Gaubert on 12 January 1988. The couple divorced and she remarried to Stanislas Fougeron on 12 March 2018. 
Alexander and Maria Pia divorced in 1967, and in 2003 she married Prince Michel of Bourbon-Parma, himself divorced from Princess Yolande de Broglie-Revel.

On 2 November 1973, Alexander married in a civil ceremony in Paris Princess Barbara Eleonore Marie of Liechtenstein (9 July 1942), daughter of Prince Johannes of Liechtenstein (first cousin once removed to Prince Hans-Adam II of Liechtenstein) and Countess Karoline of Ledebur-Wicheln (aunt of Hans Adam's late wife Marie, Princess of Liechtenstein). On 28 October 1995 Prince Alexander and Princess Barbara were married in the Orthodox faith in
Oplenac, and had issue:

 Prince Dušan Paul of Yugoslavia (born 25 September 1977), married in a civil ceremony Valerie DeMuzio on 3 July 2018 in New York, USA. On 25 May 2019 they were married in the Orthodox faith in Oplenac, Serbia.

Flying career
The Prince wished to serve in the British Royal Air Force during World War Two, but was initially prevented by his father's political affiliations. He was eventually commissioned in the RAF through the intervention of Prince George, Duke of Kent, his uncle. After the war, he sought employment as a pilot joining British European Airways in 1951, and subsequently engaging also in many aeronautic competitions.

Associations
Alexander was one of the four founding members of the Serbian Unity Congress. He was patron of the Center for Research of Orthodox Monarchism.

On 17 February 2008, Alexander issued a statement condemning the declaration of independence by Kosovo.

On the occasion of Prince Alexander's 90th birthday on 13 August 2014, a celebration of his life in words and pictures appeared in that month's UK magazine Majesty.

Death
Prince Alexander died on 12 May 2016 in Paris, where he and his wife had lived for many years. He was buried at Oplenac, Serbia, with his parents and brother, his coffin being carried by Serbian Air Force fighter pilots.

Ancestry

References 

 Settling of Heraldic Circumstances in The Princely Branch of The Serbian Royal House of Karageorgevich
 A new version of the coat of arms of H.R.H. Prince Aleksandar Karageorgevich

1924 births
2016 deaths
People from Richmond, London
Yugoslav princes
Karađorđević dynasty
Serbian princes
Serbian people of Russian descent
Yugoslav people of Russian descent
English people of Finnish descent
English people of Serbian descent
English people of Swedish descent
English people of Russian descent
English people of Greek descent
English people of German descent
English people of Danish descent
Serbian people of German descent
Serbian people of Greek descent
English Eastern Orthodox Christians
Grand Crosses of the Order of St. Sava
Burials at the Mausoleum of the Royal House of Karađorđević, Oplenac
Royal Air Force personnel of World War II
Royal Air Force officers
People educated at Ludgrove School